Ribnitz-Damgarten West is a railway station in the town of Ribnitz-Damgarten, Mecklenburg-Vorpommern, Germany. The station lies of the Stralsund–Rostock railway and the train services are operated by Deutsche Bahn.

Train services
The station is served by the following services:
intercity service (ICE 26) Binz – Stralsund – Rostock – Hamburg – Hannover – Kassel – Frankfurt (Main) – Karlsruhe
intercity service (IC 30) Binz/Greifswald – Stralsund – Rostock – Hamburg – Münster – Duisburg – Köln – Mainz – Karlsruhe
regional express (RE 9) Rostock – Velgast – Stralsund – Lietzow – Sassnitz/Binz

References

External links

Deutsche Bahn website

Railway stations in Mecklenburg-Western Pomerania
Railway stations in Germany opened in 1888
Buildings and structures in Vorpommern-Rügen